The Essential Earth, Wind & Fire is a compilation album by American band Earth, Wind & Fire issued in July 2002 by Columbia/Legacy. The Essential Earth, Wind & Fire has been certified Gold in the US by the RIAA.

Overview
With the LP came a sampler which featured remixes of Can't Hide Love and Let's Groove. During October 2002 the remix sampler was issued as a single and got to No. 4 on the UK Dance Singles Chart.

Track listing

2014 reissue

Personnel
Maurice White – vocals, kalimba, timbales, drums, producer, compilation producer
Verdine White – vocals, bass, percussion
Philip Bailey – vocals, congas, percussion
Larry Dunn – piano, organ, synthesizer, programming
Ken Yerke – violin
Harris Goldman – violin
Rollice Dale – viola
Dennis Karmazyn – cello
Harry Schultz – cello
Fred Jackson Jr. – saxophone
Herman Riley – saxophone
Jerome Richardson – saxophone
Tommy Johnson – tuba
Harvey Mason – percussion
Paulinho Da Costa – percussion
Beloyd Taylor – background vocals
Joe Wissert – producer
Charles Stepney – producer
Al McKay – producer
Leo Sacks – compilation producer

Accolades
The following accolades attributed to The Essential Earth, Wind & Fire.

References

Albums produced by Maurice White
Albums produced by Joe Wissert
Albums produced by Charles Stepney
Earth, Wind & Fire compilation albums
2002 greatest hits albums
Columbia Records compilation albums